Håkon Steinar Engh Johannessen (1 January 1936 – 30 July 2019) was a Norwegian football striker and later manager.

He played for Frigg between 1958 and 1966, becoming cup runner-up in 1965. He represented Norway as an under-21, B and senior international.

References

1936 births
2019 deaths
Footballers from Oslo
Norwegian footballers
Frigg Oslo FK players
Norway under-21 international footballers
Norway international footballers
Association football forwards
Norwegian football managers
Frigg Oslo FK managers
Lillestrøm SK managers
Strømsgodset Toppfotball managers